Tinius is a Norwegian name. It may serve as either a given name or as a surname. Individuals with the name Tinius have included the following:

 G. R. Tinius, Kansas-Oklahoma Minister (Christianity) in Churches of Christ
 Tinius Olsen, Norwegian-born American engineer and inventor
 Tinius Nagell-Erichsen, Norwegian journalist and publisher